Numertia Plantation is an historic plantation house located near Eutawville, Orangeburg County, South Carolina. It was built about 1850–1851, probably for Major Samuel Porcher. It is a two-story frame structure on a brick foundation. The house follows the pattern of central hall farmhouses, two rooms deep and two rooms wide.

It was added to the National Register of Historic Places in 1982.

References

External links

Historic American Buildings Survey in South Carolina
Houses in Orangeburg County, South Carolina
Houses on the National Register of Historic Places in South Carolina
Houses completed in 1851
National Register of Historic Places in Orangeburg County, South Carolina
1851 establishments in South Carolina